Bulimulus ustulatus is a species of  tropical air-breathing land snail, a pulmonate gastropod mollusk in the subfamily Bulimulinae.

This species is endemic to Ecuador.

References

Bulimulus
Endemic gastropods of the Galápagos Islands
Gastropods described in 1833
Taxonomy articles created by Polbot